is a former Japanese football player. He played for Japan national team.

Club career
Sasaki was born in Chiba Prefecture on June 19, 1962. After graduating from Kokushikan University, he joined Honda in 1985. He moved to All Nippon Airways in 1991. He also played at hi local club JEF United Ichihara (1992–93) and Kashiwa Reysol (1994). He retired in 1994.

National team career
On June 2, 1988, Sasaki debuted for Japan national team against China. In 1989 and 1990, he played all matches included 1990 World Cup qualification and 1990 Asian Games. He played 20 games for Japan until 1991.

Club statistics

National team statistics

References

External links
 
 Japan National Football Team Database
 

1962 births
Living people
Kokushikan University alumni
Association football people from Chiba Prefecture
Japanese footballers
Japan international footballers
Japan Soccer League players
J1 League players
Japan Football League (1992–1998) players
Honda FC players
Yokohama Flügels players
JEF United Chiba players
Kashiwa Reysol players
Footballers at the 1990 Asian Games
Association football midfielders
Asian Games competitors for Japan